Władysław Marcin Kosiniak-Kamysz (born 10 August 1981) is a Polish physician and politician. Since 2015, he has served as the chairman of the Polish People's Party (PSL). From 2011 to 2015, he was Minister of Labor and Social Affairs in the governments of Donald Tusk and Ewa Kopacz. He was a candidate for president in 2020.

Early life

Family

Kosiniak-Kamysz was born in Kraków during the time of Communist Poland. He was brought up in the tradition of the folk movement. His father, Andrzej Kosiniak-Kamysz, a doctor and politician who served as Minister of Health and Social Welfare under the first non-communist government of Tadeusz Mazowiecki where he waged a constant struggle to ensure that in a situation of permanent lack of resources, health care at a technological level began to catch up with the West. His paternal grandfather and namesake, Władysław, born at the beginning of the First World War, served as a soldier in the 13th Wilno Uhlan Regiment and Farmers' Battalions during the Second World War. After the war, he returned to his hometown of Bieniaszowice, where he ran his farm next to the mouth of the Dunajec to the Vistula, with his grandmother.

Education

He studied in Kraków, where his parents moved. Kosiniak-Kamysz attended the Jan III Sobieski High School, Kraków. He subsequently studied medical studies at the Jagiellonian University Medical College until 2006. He wanted to be a doctor to help others and save their lives. He became an assistant at the Department of Internal Medicine and Rural Medicine of the Jagiellonian University. In 2010, Kosiniak-Kamysz obtained his doctorate in medical science among with Tomasz Guzik. He received his doctorate based on the thesis labelled "The relationship of gene variation encoding GTP cyclohydrolase with the function of vascular endothelium in patients with type 2 diabetes", in which he studied the genetic determinants of diabetes. Kosiniak-Kamysz conducted scientific research, amongst others at the Emory University School of Medicine in Atlanta.

He started his first job at the Department of Internal Diseases and Rural Medicine of the Collegium Medicum of the Jagiellonian University, which he held a medical internship there. Throughout his studies, Kosiniak-Kamysz was a volunteer of the Volunteer Association of Saint Elijah operated at the Church of the Visitation of the Blessed Virgin Mary, Kraków.

Political career

Kosiniak-Kamysz has always been associated with the Polish People's Party. He co-founded the PSL youth wing - Young People's Forum. Together they represented the people in TVP "Młodzież Kontra", in which they interviewed politicians. In this way, they gained their first skills in politics. Kosiniak-Kamysz took part in 12 electoral campaigns of the Polish People's Party. This was the first time during the 2000 presidential election when he supported Jarosław Kalinowski's organisation by issuing leaflets, hanging posters and collecting signatures for electoral lists.

In the 2010 local elections, Władysław Kosiniak-Kamysz received 763 votes. Since Jacek Majchrowski was the mayor of Kraków, he was able to take his seat in the city council of Krakow.

On 18 August 2011 he was appointed as Minister of Labor and Social Affairs in Donald Tusk's second cabinet. He served in this post until 16 November 2015.

In the 2015 parliamentary elections, the PSL and Civic Platform lost their parliamentary majority, and since then have been in the opposition. Due to the poor election result and because he did not get a mandate, Janusz Piechociński resigned as party chairman, and Kosiniak-Kamysz succeeded him on 7 November 2015. In 2019, the PSL jointed to the Polish Coalition with political movement Kukiz'15 and political party Union of European Democrats. In 2019 parliamentary election, he received 33 784 votes.

He was one of the main candidates in the 2020 presidential election; in some polls, he obtained the second place, granting him a place in the second round; though the current president Andrzej Duda has a large advantage above him (about 30% or more). Finally, Kosiniak-Kamysz received 2,36%.

Personal life

He divorced his first wife in 2016. He married Paulina Kosiniak-Kamysz in 2019, with whom he has a daughter Zofia.

He is Catholic.

References 

Polish People's Party politicians
1981 births
Living people
Government ministers of Poland
Members of the Polish Sejm 2015–2019
Members of the Polish Sejm 2019–2023
Candidates in the 2020 Polish presidential election
Jagiellonian University alumni
Polish Roman Catholics